Nijkerk (Dutch Low Saxon: Niekark) is a municipality and a city located in the middle of the Netherlands, in the province of Gelderland.

Population centres 

Some people state that Groot Corlaer is a population centre on its own, but it is officially part of Nijkerk.

Transportation
Railway station: Nijkerk

The city of Nijkerk 

The name Nijkerk stems from Nieuwe Kerk (Dutch for New Church). This new church was built after the old chapel had been destroyed by fire in 1221. Nijkerk was strategically located between the Duchy of Guelders (Dutch: Hertogdom Gelre) and the Bishopric of Utrecht. Because of this strategic location Nijkerk regularly was the scene of war, and in 1412 the village was completely destroyed. It was restored and Nijkerk received city rights in 1413. In 1421 the church that gave Nijkerk its name burnt down and was replaced; this happened several times, until a new church, the Grote-of-Sint-Catharinakerk; was built in the 18th century. It still stands today. The organ in this church was built in 1756 by Mathijs van Deventer.

In the 18th century Nijkerk was a flourishing merchant city. Several inhabitants traveled to the New World, such as Arent van Curler and Kiliaen van Rensselaer and founded new cities.

Since World War II, Nijkerk has been growing fast. It is situated on the (former) shore of the IJsselmeer, which allows for transportation of goods via ships, and in the proximity of two major motorways, the E30 (A1) and E232 (A28). This allowed local industries to grow, and also encouraged a lot of people who work in the nearby Randstad to move to the more rural and peaceful town of Nijkerk. The easy access to the Veluwe is also a contributing factor to this growth.

Politics 
In 2000, the municipalities of Nijkerk and Hoevelaken merged to form the new municipality of Nijkerk.
On August 24, 2011, the municipality announced that Nijkerk had passed the mark of 40,000 inhabitants. The city council was consequently expanded to 27 seats for the 2014 election.

Currently (March, 2020) the seats are divided as follows:

Progressief 21 is a local party combining the local chapters of the Democrats 66, GroenLinks and the Labour Party. The last two parties are local parties that have no national connection.

Geography

Climate

Notable residents 

 Kiliaen van Rensselaer (1586 in Hasselt - ca.1642), merchant and Hudson Valley patroon
 Wouter van Twiller (1606 in Nijkerk – 1654) the Director of New Netherland 1632 to 1638.
 Arent van Curler (1619 in Nijkerk - 1667), founder of Schenectady, New York
 Johann Frederik Eijkman (1851 in Nijkerk – 1915), chemist
 James Kwast (1852 in Nijkerk - 1927), pianist and teacher
 Christiaan Eijkman (1858 in Nijkerk - 1930), physician and professor of physiology, received the Nobel Prize for Physiology or Medicine in 1929 for the discovery of vitamins
 Jakob van Domselaer (1890 in Nijkerk – 1960), composer, part of De Stijl with Piet Mondrian
 Bernardus Johannes Alfrink (1900 in Nijkerk - 1987), Cardinal, Roman Catholic Archdiocese of Utrecht
 Henri Nouwen (1932 in Nijkerk - 1996), Catholic priest, professor, writer and theologian
 Kees de Kort (born 1934 in Nijkerk) an artist, illustrates Bible scenes for children's books. 
 Norbert Klein (born 1956), politician, currently lives in Hoevelaken
 Levi van Veluw (born 1985 in Hoevelaken), contemporary artist using photographs, videos and sculptures

Sport 
 Brigitte van der Lans (born 1968 in Hoevelaken), former backstroke swimmer, competed at the 1984 Summer Olympics
 Bram van Polen (born 1985 in Nijkerk), footballer, 385 caps with PEC Zwolle
 Scott Deroue (born 1995 in Nijkerkerveen), motorcycle racer
 Donny van de Beek (born 1997 in Nijkerkerveen), professional footballer

Twin town 
Nijkerk is twinned with

Gallery

References

External links 

Official website

 
Municipalities of Gelderland
Populated places in Gelderland
Cities in the Netherlands